Akrebin Yolculuğu (English: Journey on a Clock Hand) is a 1997 Turkish romance film directed by Ömer Kavur. It was screened in the Un Certain Regard section at the 1997 Cannes Film Festival.

Cast
 Mehmet Aslantuğ as Kerem
 Sahika Tekand as Esra
 Tuncel Kurtiz as Agah
 Nüvit Özdoğru as Hotel owner
 Macit Koper as Bell founder
 Rana Cabbar as Butler
 Tomris Oğuzalp
 Mümtaz Açıkgöz
 Aytaç Arman as Mysterious man
 Kenan Bal
 Aslan Kaçar
 Etem Kara
 Arzu Kuyas
 Mahmut Yıldırım
 Ruşen Yılmaz

See also
 Cinema of Turkey

References

External links
 

1997 films
1990s Turkish-language films
Films directed by Ömer Kavur
1990s romance films
Films set in Turkey
Turkish romance films
Films scored by Attila Özdemiroğlu